Music from and Inspired by Spider-Man 2 is the soundtrack album for the 2004 film Spider-Man 2. As a whole, the album reached the top 10 of the U.S. album charts and the top 40 of the Australian album charts. "Vindicated" by Dashboard Confessional reached the top of a world composite soundtrack chart in June 2004 and the top 20 of a composite world and U.S. modern rock chart. "We Are" by Ana Johnsson was a major success in Europe, charting in almost every European country. "Ordinary" by Train was on the U.S. adult top 40 singles charts. "I Am" by Killing Heidi was added to the Australian version of the soundtrack and released as a single in the country. It debuted and peaked at number 16 on the country's ARIA Charts on July 19, 2004.

Track listing
The track listing for the U.S. version of the soundtrack is:

International pressings
Many versions of the soundtrack outside the United States contained additional tracks by artists exclusive to their native countries.

In the UK version of the soundtrack, Switchfoot's hit single "Meant to Live" is featured as track 12 between "The Night That the Lights Went Out in NYC" and "We Are".
On the Australian version of the soundtrack, "I Am" by Killing Heidi appears as track 17.
On the Japanese version of the soundtrack, "Web of Night" by T.M. Revolution appears and was a popular single in Japan. A track by indie band Mew called "She Spider" was also featured on the Japanese release.
On the Pakistani version of the soundtrack, a song by Strings titled "Najane Kyun" which translates to "Don't Know Why" was used.
On the Polish version of the soundtrack, the single "Chron to co masz" by PtakY appears as track 17.
In Brazil, the band Jota Quest recorded the "Theme from Spider-Man" and was included as track 16.
In Indonesian version of the soundtrack, "Cry Out" by Edane included as the last track of the pressings, with an official video music released.

Omissions
3 Doors Down's single "Let Me Go" was originally intended for the soundtrack but was withheld and instead featured on their third album Seventeen Days.
The song "Where I Belong" by Sia was earmarked to appear on the soundtrack, but owing to a record label conflict, its inclusion was withdrawn. The single's cover art features Sia dressed in a Spider-Man costume.

The closing credits of the film featured a version of the theme from the original television cartoon series performed by Canadian crooner Michael Bublé. While not featured on the album, it was released as a single to promote the film, and contained remixes by Junkie XL and Ralphi Rosario.

Charts

Weekly charts

Year-end charts

Certifications

Spider-Man 2: Original Motion Picture Score

Although the soundtrack contains a portion of Danny Elfman's score, a more complete album of the film music was released as Spider-Man 2: Original Motion Picture Score. Tracks 10 and 11 are listed as "Bonus Tracks" as they were not used in the film (John Debney and Christopher Young reworked several cues of the score, in addition to music from the first film being tracked in). Score performed by The Hollywood Studio Symphony; conducted by Pete Anthony.

Track listing

Instrumentation
 Strings: 30 violins, 14 violas, 14 cellos, 8 double basses
 Woodwinds: 3 flutes, 2 oboes, 3 clarinets, 3 bassoons
 Brass: 12 French horns, 4 trumpets, 6 trombones, 2 tubas
 Percussion: 6 players
 2 harps, 1 piano

References

2004 soundtrack albums
2000s film soundtrack albums
Danny Elfman soundtracks
Spider-Man film soundtracks
Spider-Man (2002 film series)
Columbia Records soundtracks
Sony Music soundtracks